This is the list of cathedrals in Senegal.

Roman Catholic 
Cathedrals of the Roman Catholic Church in Senegal:
 Cathedral of Our Lady of Victories in Dakar
 Cathédrale Saint-Théophile in Kaolack
 Cathedral of Our Lady of Victory in Kolda
 Cathedral of St. Louis in Saint-Louis
 Cathedral of Mary Queen of the World in Tambacounda
 St. Anne Cathedral in Thiès
 Cathedral of St. Anthony of Padua in Ziguinchor

See also
List of cathedrals

References

Cathedrals in Senegal
Senegal
Cathedrals
Cathedrals